"Real Shit" is a song by American rapper and singer Juice Wrld and American music producer Benny Blanco. It was written by Wrld alongside producers Blanco, Cashmere Cat, Dylan Brady, Henry Kwapis and Jack Karaszewski. It was released to digital retailers as a single by Grade A Productions and Interscope Records on December 2, 2020. It was included as part of the reissue of Blanco's debut studio album Friends Keep Secrets, released in 2021.

Background
"Real Shit" was released on what would have been Juice Wrld's twenty-second birthday. While Juice and Blanco have collaborated in the past on "Graduation" and "Roses", Blanco revealed that the posthumous song was the first song they recorded, although the commercial release is an updated version of the original recording with more musicians contributing to the production.

They made about six songs on the first night, including "Roses" and "Real Shit", the latter of which was "the first time [Blanco] saw [Juice's] magic". Blanco said that "the whole room dropped their jaws and watched [Juice] in awe", knowing that they "were in the room with a man who was going to change music forever". Juice went in the vocal booth and recorded the entire song in one take, then he did it three more times and said: "Pick the best one". Blanco said that "they were all perfect songs".

Release
"Real Shit" was first teased on November 30, 2020. Blanco posted a short instrumental snippet on social media which featured an animated version of the single cover art and a caption which reads "tomorrow", along with an old picture of him and Wrld cracking up. On December 2, 2020, a lyric video for the song was released on YouTube.

Composition
"Real Shit" is a pop-punk and trap song with a length of three minutes and three seconds. Lyrically, Juice reflects on his life, celebrating happier moments and counting his blessings.

Credits and personnel
Credits adapted from Tidal.

 Juice Wrld – songwriting, rap vocals
 Benny Blanco – songwriting, production, keyboards, mixing
 Cashmere Cat – songwriting, production, keyboards, programming
 Dylan Brady – songwriting, production, guitar, keyboards, programming
 Henry Kwapis – songwriting, production, keyboards, programming
 Jack Karaszewski – songwriting, production, guitar, keyboards, programming
 Chris Gehringer – mastering

Charts

References

External links
 
 

2020 songs
2020 singles
Juice Wrld songs
Songs written by Juice Wrld
Songs written by Benny Blanco
Songs written by Cashmere Cat
Songs written by Dylan Brady
Song recordings produced by Benny Blanco
Song recordings produced by Cashmere Cat
Songs released posthumously
Interscope Records singles
American pop punk songs